Gharibian, Gharibyan, Garibyan or Garibian  (Armenian: Ղարիբյան) is an Armenian surname that may refer to:
Davit Gharibyan (born 1990), Armenian model and actor
Faramarz Gharibian, Iranian actor and director
Gregory Garibian (1924–1991), Armenian physicist
Mamikon Gharibyan (born 2004), Armenian chess player

Armenian-language surnames